The 2011 Hong Kong Games, officially known as The 3rd Hong Kong Games, is a major biannual multi-sport event to be held in Hong Kong between the 18 Districts. The games will take place from 14 May to 5 June 2011.

Event
It total there are 83 events in the 8 sports. This includes 42 events for male and 41 events for female. Compare with 2009 Hong Kong Games, futsal and volleyball are the new event.

The 8 sports are:
Athletics
Basketball
Badminton
Swimming
Table Tennis
Tennis
Futsal
Volleyball

The 18 District Councils recruited athletes in an open selection process to represent their district in the event.

Venue 
Here is the final venue of each events.

Awards
The District with the highest total scores will be crowned Overall Champion, followed by the first and second runners-up.

Other awards include:
 The Best Local Characteristics Award
 District with the Greatest Participation
 The Best Performance Award (for cheering)

The 2011 event will see the addition of awards for "District with the Most Gold Medals" and "District with the Best Progress".

Medal Tally
Hong Kong is a relatively small Special Administrative Region, so it is impossible for districts take turn to host the event. The event is held regionwide.

2015 Hong Kong Games

See also
 2009 Hong Kong Games

References

2011
Hong Kong Games
Hong Kong Games